Lake Easton is a lake and reservoir along the course of the Yakima River in the U.S. state of Washington. It is located in Township 20N, Range 13E. The Yakima River flows into the lake from the west, and out to the southwest, through the 1929 Easton Diversion Dam. The Kachess River also flows into the lake from the north, where it effectively empties into the Yakima River. 

Lake Easton is located south of Interstate 90 and northwest of Easton and is the primary attraction of Lake Easton State Park. Palouse to Cascades State Park Trail is immediately south of the lake. The lake is not stocked and has only fair fishing for rainbow, cutthroat and eastern brook trout after late May.

References

External links
Easton Lake Washington Department of Fish and Wildlife

Easton
Easton
Protected areas of Kittitas County, Washington